Davenport is a restaurant in Portland, Oregon.

History
Kevin Gibson and Kurt Heilemann opened the restaurant in November 2013. Davenport began serving ice cream one month later.

Reception
Michael Russell of The Oregonian gave the restaurant a rating of 'A–'. Bon Appétit included Davenport in a list of "The 50 Nominees for America's Best New Restaurants 2014".

References

External links

 
 Davenport at Condé Nast Traveler
 Davenport at Zomato

2013 establishments in Oregon
Kerns, Portland, Oregon
Northeast Portland, Oregon
Restaurants established in 2013
Restaurants in Portland, Oregon